Welcher & Welcher was an Australian sitcom written by and starring Shaun Micallef which aired on the ABC in 2003. The show revolved around a husband and wife run law firm.

Regular cast
Shaun Micallef - Quentin Charles Welcher (Lawyer and head of 'Welcher & Welcher' Law firm)
Robyn Butler - Kate Welcher (Office Manager/Lawyer and wife of Quentin)
Francis Greenslade - Peter-Paul Cohen (Lawyer)/Claude Buzzo (client)
Santo Cilauro - Griffin (bumbling IT Manager)
Anita Smith - Jan (Quentin's Personal Assistant)
Nina Liu - Tia (Receptionist)

Episodes
One series of the show was produced and was aired throughout early 2003 on the ABC.

Award nominations
In 2003, Welcher & Welcher received an AFI nomination for Francis Greenslade's performance as 'Best Actor in a Supporting or Guest Role in a Television Drama or Comedy'. Shaun Micallef also received a nomination from the Australian Comedy Awards for 'Outstanding Comic Performance on Australian TV' (although this also included his performance on 'Micallef Tonight').

DVD release
The two-disc DVD set was released at the end of 2012 and contains all eight episodes plus "Never-before-seen outtakes". Aspect ratio is 16:9, audio is two-channel, region is ALL, format is PAL.

References

External links
Official ABC page

Australian television sitcoms
Australian Broadcasting Corporation original programming
2003 Australian television series debuts
2003 Australian television series endings